Jude Frazier Acers (born April 6, 1944 in Long Beach, California) is a chess master, showman (simultaneous exhibitor), and chess author/writer.

Early years 
Acers spent much of his childhood in an orphanage. His father was a Marine and was away a lot and his mother struggled with mental issues. When he was five, he saw a book about chess and started playing. His father returned when he was an adolescent and took him from the North Carolina orphanage to New Orleans. His father was abusive, and committed Acers at the age of 14 to Louisiana's state mental institution in Mandeville. At 17, Acers was already rated as a master by the U.S. Chess Federation. The state paid for him to get a degree in Russian from Louisiana State University.

Chess biography
Acers is best known for playing against all comers in a New Orleans downtown gazebo while wearing a red beret. A longtime resident of Louisiana, he claims to have been the first New Orleans native chess master of comparable strength since Paul Morphy.

He is also known for being a great showman, touring the country giving simultaneous chess exhibitions. He was twice the world record holder of having played the most opponents in a simultaneous exhibition. First against 117 opponents (1974, Lloyd Center, Portland, Oregon), then against 179 opponents (1976, Mid Island Plaza, Long Island, New York). The records were certified by the Guinness Book of World Records.

Acers barely survived Hurricane Katrina and lived in a displaced persons camp for some time. As the city recovered, he returned to New Orleans and resumed his customary chess table in the French Quarter.

Playing strength
In September 2007 Acers defeated  Bill Hook  in the first round of the World Senior Championship held in Gmunden, Austria. Acers' recent result at the 17th World Senior Chess Championship, with a FIDE performance of 2289, should help to confirm his playing strength.

Author/writer
Acers has written or contributed to several chess books. In 2008 he is working on The Road which will be a book about his chess tours. He has annotated many American master-level games, along with Louis Ciamarra, for the Yugoslav-published series Chess Informant.

Books
The Italian Gambit (and) A Guiding Repertoire For White – E4!

References

External links

 
 
 
 Jude Acers results at the World Senior Championship
 American chess icon hit by Katrina from Chessbase.com
 The Amazing & Slightly Irregular Jude Acers by Derek Bridges Extensive biographical portrait

1944 births
Living people
American chess players
American chess writers
American male non-fiction writers
Sportspeople from New Orleans